Saudade (plural saudades) is an emotional state of melancholic or profoundly nostalgic longing for a beloved yet absent something or someone. It is often associated with a repressed understanding that one might never encounter the recipient of longing ever again. It is a recollection of feelings, experiences, places, or events that cause a sense of separation from the exciting, pleasant, or joyous sensations they once caused. It derives from the Latin word for solitude.

Nascimento and Meandro (2005) cite Duarte Nunes Leão's definition of saudade: "Memory of something with a desire for it."

In Brazil, the day of Saudade is officially celebrated on 30 January. It is not a widely acknowledged day in Portugal.

History

Saudade ultimately derives from the Latin solitās, solitātem, meaning "solitude" . The word saudade was used in the Cancioneiro da Ajuda (13th century), in the Cancioneiro da Vaticana and by poets of the time of King Denis of Portugal (reigned 1279–1325).
Some specialists argue that the word may have originated during the Great Portuguese Discoveries, expressing and giving meaning to the sadness felt about those who departed on journeys to unknown seas and often disappeared in shipwrecks, died in battle, or simply never returned. Those who stayed behind—mostly women and children—suffered deeply in their absence. However, the Portuguese discoveries only started in 1415, and since the word has been found in earlier texts, this does not constitute a very good explanation. The Reconquista also offers a plausible explanation.

The state of mind has subsequently become a "Portuguese way of life": a constant feeling of absence, the sadness of something that's missing, wistful longing for completeness or wholeness and the yearning for the return of what is now gone, a desire for presence as opposed to absence—as it is said in Portuguese, a strong desire to matar as saudades (lit. to kill the saudades).

In the latter half of the 20th century, saudade became associated with the longing for one's homeland, as hundreds of thousands of Portuguese-speaking people left in search of better futures in South America, North America, and Western Europe. Besides the implications derived from a wave of emigration trend from the motherland, historically speaking saudade is the term associated with the decline of Portugal's role in world politics and trade. During the so-called "Golden Age", synonymous with the era of discovery, Portugal  rose to the status of a world power, and its monarchy became one of the richest in Europe. But with the competition from other European nations, the country went both colonially and economically into a prolonged period of decay. This period of decline and resignation from the world's cultural stage marked the rise of saudade, aptly described by a sentence in Portugal's national anthem: Levantai hoje de novo o esplendor de Portugal (Lift up once again today the splendour of Portugal).

Definition
The Dicionário Houaiss da Língua Portuguesa defines saudade (or saudades) as "A somewhat melancholic feeling of incompleteness. It is related to thinking back on situations of privation due to the absence of someone or something, to move away from a place or thing, or to the absence of a set of particular and desirable experiences and pleasures once lived."

The Dictionary from the Royal Galician Academy, on the other hand, defines saudade as an "intimate feeling and mood caused by the longing for something absent that is being missed. This can take different aspects, from concrete realities (a loved one, a friend, the motherland, the homeland...) to the mysterious and transcendent. It is quite prevalent and characteristic of the Galician-Portuguese world, but it can also be found in other cultures."

Related words
Saudade is a word in Portuguese and Galician that claims no direct translation in English. However, a close translation in English would be "desiderium." Desiderium is defined as an ardent desire or longing, especially a feeling of loss or grief for something lost. Desiderium comes from the word desiderare, meaning to long for. Connections between desiderium and nostalgia have also been drawn; the former can be seen as expressing the latter for things that can’t be experienced any more, or things that someone may have never experienced themselves.

In Portuguese, "Tenho saudades tuas" or "Estou com saudades de ti/você" translates as "I have (feel) saudade of you" meaning "I miss you", but carries a much stronger tone. In fact, one can have saudade of someone whom one is with, but have some feeling of loss towards the past or the future. For example, one can  have "saudade" towards part of the relationship or emotions once experienced for/with someone, though the person in question is still part of one's life, as in "Tenho saudade do que fomos" (I feel "saudade" of the way we were). Another example can illustrate this use of the word saudade: "Que saudade!" indicating a general feeling of longing, whereby the object of longing can be a general and undefined entity/occasion/person/group/period etc. This feeling of longing can be accompanied or better described by an abstract will to be where the object of longing is.

Despite being hard to translate in full, saudade has equivalent words in other cultures, and is often related to music styles expressing this feeling such as the blues for African-Americans, Sehnsucht in German, dor in Romania, Tizita in Ethiopia, Hiraeth in Welsh, or Assouf for the Tuareg people, appocundria in Neapolitan. In Slovak, the word is clivota or cnenie, and in Czech, the word is stesk. In Turkish, the word Hasret meaning longing, yearning or nostalgia has similar connotations, as does the Polish “tęsknota”.

The similar melancholic music style is known in Bosnia-Herzegovina as sevdalinkah (from Turkish sevda: infatuation, ultimately from Arabic سَوْدَاء sawdā' : 'black [bile]', translation of the Greek µέλαινα χολή, mélaina cholē from which the term melancholy is derived).

Elements

Saudade is similar but not equal to nostalgia, a word that also exists in Portuguese.

In the book In Portugal of 1912, A. F. G. Bell writes: 

A stronger form of saudade may be felt towards people and things whose whereabouts are unknown, such as old ways and sayings; a lost lover who is sadly missed; a faraway place where one was raised; loved ones who have died; feelings and stimuli one used to have; and the faded, yet golden memories of youth. Although it relates to feelings of melancholy and fond memories of things/people/days gone by, it can be a rush of sadness coupled with a paradoxical joy derived from acceptance of fate and the hope of recovering or substituting what is lost by something that will either fill in the void or provide consolation.

To F. D. Santos, Saudade as a noun has become a longing for longing itself:

Music
As with all emotions, saudade has been an inspiration for many songs and compositions. "Sodade" (saudade in Cape Verdean Creole) is the title of the Cape Verde singer Cesária Évora's most famous song. Étienne Daho, a French singer, also produced a song of the same name. The Good Son, a 1990 album by Nick Cave and the Bad Seeds, was heavily informed by Cave's mental state at the time, which he has described as saudade. He told journalist Chris Bohn: "When I explained to someone that what I wanted to write about was the memory of things that I thought were lost for me, I was told that the Portuguese word for this feeling was saudade. It's not nostalgia but something sadder."

The usage of saudade as a theme in Portuguese music goes back to the 16th century, the golden age of Portugal. Saudade, as well as love suffering, is a common theme in many villancicos and cantigas composed by Portuguese authors; for example: "Lágrimas de Saudade" (tears of saudade), which is an anonymous work from the Cancioneiro de Paris. Fado is a Portuguese music style, generally sung by a single person (the fadista) along with a Portuguese guitar. The most popular themes of fado are saudade, nostalgia, jealousy, and short stories of the typical city quarters. Fado and saudade are intertwined key ideas in Portuguese culture. The word fado comes from Latin fatum meaning "fate" or "destiny". Fado is a musical cultural expression and recognition of this unassailable determinism which compels the resigned yearning of saudade, a bitter-sweet, existential yearning and hopefulness towards something over which one has no control.

Spanish singer Julio Iglesias, whose father is a Galician, speaks of saudade in his song "Un Canto a Galicia" (which roughly translates as "a song/chant for Galicia"). In the song, he passionately uses the phrase to describe a deep and sad longing for his motherland, Galicia. He also performs a song called "Morriñas", which describes the Galicians as having a deeply strong saudade.

The Paraguayan guitarist Agustin Barrios wrote several pieces invoking the feeling of saudade, including Choro de Saudade and Preludio Saudade. The term is prominent in Brazilian popular music, including the first bossa nova song, "Chega de Saudade" ("No more saudade", usually translated as "No More Blues"), written by Tom Jobim.
Jazz pianist Bill Evans recorded the tune "Saudade de Brasil" numerous times. In 1919, on returning from two years in Brazil, the French composer Darius Milhaud composed a suite, Saudades do Brasil, which exemplified the concept of saudade. "Saudade (Part II)" is also the title of a flute solo by the band Shpongle. The fado singer Amália Rodrigues typified themes of saudade in some of her songs. J-Rock band Porno Graffitti has a song entitled "サウダージ", "Saudaaji" transliterated ("Saudade"). The city pop guitarist Masayoshi Takanaka has an album titled Saudade. The alternative rock band Love And Rockets has a song named "Saudade" on their album Seventh Dream of Teenage Heaven. June 2012 brought Bearcat's release of their self-titled indie album that included a song called "Saudade".

The Dutch jazz/Rock guitarist Jan Akkerman recorded a composition called "Saudade", the centerpiece of his 1996 album Focus in Time. The Belgian electronic music band Arsenal recorded a song called "Saudade" on their album Outsides (2005). The jazz fusion group Trio Beyond, consisting of John Scofield, Jack DeJohnette, and Larry Goldings released in 2006 an album dedicated to drummer Tony Williams (1945–1997), called Saudades. Dance music artist Peter Corvaia released a progressive house track entitled "Saudade" on HeadRush Music, a sub-label of Toes in the Sand Recordings. New York City post-rock band Mice Parade released an album entitled Obrigado Saudade in 2004. Chris Rea also recorded a song entitled "Saudade Part 1 & 2 (Tribute To Ayrton Senna)" as a tribute to Ayrton Senna, the Brazilian three-times Formula One world champion killed on the track in May 1994. There is an ambient/noise/shoegazing band from Portland, Oregon, named Saudade. The rock band Extreme has a Portuguese guitarist Nuno Bettencourt; the influence of his heritage can be seen in the band's album Saudades de Rock. During recording, the mission statement was to bring back musicality to the medium. "Nancy Spain", a song by Barney Rush, made famous by an adaptation by Christy Moore, is another example of the use of saudade in contemporary Irish music, the chorus of which is:
"No matter where I wander I'm still haunted by your name
The portrait of your beauty stays the same
Standing by the ocean wondering where you've gone
If you'll return again
Where is the ring I gave to Nancy Spain?"

American singer/songwriter Grayson Hugh wrote a song called "Saudade" that he performed with jazz guitarist Norman Johnson on Johnson's 2013 album "Get It While You Can".

Kingston-Upon-Hull IDM Electronica, Downtempo and Deep Groove legend, Steve Cobby, of Fila Brazillia, Solid Doctor, Heights of Abraham, the Twilight Singers debut notoriety and other musical incarnations and collaborations, released a 12 track album "Saudade" in March 2014 on DÉCLASSÉ Recordings.

Washington DC electronica duo Thievery Corporation released the studio album Saudade in 2014 via their Eighteenth Street Lounge Music label.

Brazilian singer Ana Frango Electrico released a song called "Saudade" as the opening track on their 2019 album "Little Electric Chicken Heart"

A. R. Rahman's soundtrack for the 2020 Hindi film Dil Bechara features an instrumental track called "The Horizon of Saudade".

Icelandic music producer Ólafur Arnalds released the single "Saudade (When We Are Born)" in 2021.

In 2022, Portuguese singer Maro released a song called "Saudade, saudade" and represented Portugal with it in the Eurovision Song Contest 2022 in Turin, Italy. The song placed 9th in the grand final.

Literature

The Portuguese author Fernando Pessoa's posthumous collection of writings The Book of Disquiet is written almost entirely in a tone of saudade, and deals with themes of nostalgia and alienation. Australian author Suneeta Peres Da Costa's novella Saudade follows Maria, a young girl from a Goan immigrant family, growing up in a political hierarchy of racism and colonialism

Variations

Saudade is also associated with Galicia, where it is used similarly to the word morriña (longingness). Yet, morriña often implies a deeper stage of saudade, a "saudade so strong it can even kill," as the Galician saying goes. Morriña was a term often used by emigrant Galicians when talking about the Galician motherland they left behind. Although saudade is also a Galician word, the meaning of longing for something that might return is generally associated with morriña. A literary example showing the understanding of the difference and the use of both words is the song Un canto a Galicia by Julio Iglesias. The word used by Galicians speaking Spanish has spread and become common in all Spain and even accepted by the Academia.

In Portugal, morrinha is a word to describe sprinkles, while morrinhar means "to sprinkle." (The most common Portuguese equivalents are chuvisco and chuviscar, respectively.) Morrinha is also used in northern Portugal for referring to sick animals, for example of sheep dropsy, and occasionally to sick or sad people, often with irony. It is also used in some Brazilian regional dialects for the smell of wet or sick animals.

In Goa, India, which was a Portuguese colony until 1961, some Portuguese influences still remain. A suburb of Margão, Goa's largest city, has a street named Rua de Saudades. It was aptly named because that very street has the Christian cemetery, the Hindu shmashana (cremation ground) and the Muslim qabrastan (cemetery). Most people living in the city of Margão who pass by this street would agree that the name of the street could not be any other, as they often think fond memories of a friend, loved one, or relative whose remains went past that road. 

In Cape Verdean Creole there is the word sodadi (also spelled sodade), originated in the Portuguese saudade and exactly with the same meaning.

See also

 Grief
Han
 Hiraeth
 Mono no aware
 Nostalgia
 Sehnsucht
 Good old days

References

Further reading
 Lourcenço, Eduardo (1999). Mitologia da saudade (Seguido de Portugal como destino) . São Paulo: Companhia das Letras. .
 Rappa, Antonio L. Saudade: The Culture and Security of Eurasians in Southeast Asia. Ethos Books and Singapore Management University's Wee Kim Wee Centre, 2013.
 Ribeiro, Bernardim (Torrao, ~1482 – Lisboa, ~1552). Livro das Saudades .

External links
 Emotion as Collective Identity: the case of Portuguese Saudade, Marcia Esteves Agostinho, Academia Letters, February 2021
 Aesthetics of Saudade – Essay comprising the major theories and explaining the doubts surrounding the translation of saudade
 "BBC Brasil": Saudade is the 7th most difficult word to translate (in Portuguese), London: BBC, 23 June 2004.
 saudade, dictionary.com

Emotions
Portuguese words and phrases
Translation
Nostalgia
Melancholia
Love
Maritime culture
Words and phrases with no direct English translation